The following is a list of products from the French-owned computer hardware and software company Groupe Bull.

Computer hardware 
 Bull Gamma series
Gamma 3 (1953)
Gamma 55 (1967) (also known as GE 55)
 (1960)
Gamma 30  (1964) (RCA 301)
 Gamma M 40 (1965)
 Gamma 10 (1966)
 CAB500 (1962)
 Série 300 TI (1962)
 GE-600 series (1965)
 GE 400 (1967)
 GE 115 (1966)
 GE-265 (1968)
 GE 58 (1970)
 CII Iris 50 (1970)
 CII Iris 60 (1972)
 CII Iris 80 (1972)
 CII Mitra 15 (1972)
 Honeywell H200 (1970)
 HB 2000 (1973)
 Micral (1973)
 Mini6 (1978)
 CII HB 64/40 (1976)
 CII HB 66/60 (1976)
 CII HB 61 DPS (1978)
Bull DS800 (2007)
Bull DPS series
 DPS4 (1980)
 DPS7 and DPS 7000 (1981)
DPS6 series (1983)
 DPS 8 (1984)
DPS 6 Plus and DPS 8000 (1987) 
DPS 9000 (1999)
 Bull DPX series
Bull DPX 2 (1992)
Bull DPX 20
SM 90 (1981)
 Correlative Syst. 1982
 SPS7 and SPS9
 Bull Escala (1994)
 Bull NovaScale (2004)
Novascale bullion (2010)
 Bull bullx (2009)
Bull Estrella
Bull Series 4000 Printing System (1988)

Mobile phones 
In October 2013 Groupe Bull introduced the Hoox line of cellular phones with enhanced encryption and biometric authentication  targeting security-conscious users.

Models:
 Hoox m1 mobile phone
 Hoox m2 smartphone

Computers on the TOP500 list 

As of June 2012 Bull has 16 machines on the TOP500 supercomputer list

References

Groupe Bull products
Groupe Bull products
Groupe Bull
Groupe Bull